As part of the British honours system, Special Honours are issued at the Monarch's pleasure at any given time. The Special Honours refer to the awards made within royal prerogative, operational honours and other honours awarded outside the New Years Honours and Birthday Honours.

Hereditary Peerage 
 His Royal Highness Prince Henry Charles Albert David,  to be Duke of Sussex, Earl of Dumbarton and Baron Kilkeel – 19 May 2018

Life Peerages

Conservative Party

 Diana Barran, to be Baroness Barran, of Bathwick in the City of Bath – 21 June 2018
 The Rt Hon. Sir Edward Garnier, to be Baron Garnier, of Harborough in the County of Leicestershire – 22 June 2018
 The Rt Hon. Sir Alan Haselhurst, to be Baron Haselhurst, of Saffron Walden in the County of Essex – 22 June 2018
 The Rt Hon. Peter Lilley, to be Baron Lilley, of Offa in the County of Hertfordshire – 19 June 2018  
 Catherine Meyer (Lady Meyer),  to be Baroness Meyer, of Nine Elms in the London Borough of Wandsworth – 19 June 2018 
 The Rt Hon. Sir Eric Pickles, to be Baron Pickles, of Brentwood and Ongar in the County of Essex – 19 June 2018
 The Rt Hon. Sir John Randall, to be Baron Randall of Uxbridge, of Uxbridge in the London Borough of Hillingdon – 25 June 2018
 Amanda Sater, to be Baroness Sater, of Kensington in the Royal Borough of Kensington and Chelsea – 21 June 2018

Labour Party

 Martha Osamor, to be Baroness Osamor, of Tottenham in the London Borough of Haringey and of Asaba in the Republic of Nigeria - 25 November 2018
 Pauline Bryan, to be Baroness Bryan of Partick, of Partick in the City of Glasgow – 21 June 2018
 Iain McNicol, to be Baron McNicol of West Kilbride, of West Kilbride in the County of Ayrshire – 21 June 2018

Democratic Unionist Party

 The Rev. Dr. William McCrea, to be Baron McCrea of Magherafelt and Cookstown, of Magherafelt in the County of Londonderry and of Cookstown in the County of Tyrone  – 19 June 2018

Non-affiliated

 The Rt Hon. Andrew Tyrie, to be Baron Tyrie, of Chichester in the County of West Sussex – 13 June 2018

Crossbench

 Sir David Anderson, to be Baron Anderson of Ipswich, 	of Ipswich in the County of Suffolk – 10 July 2018
 Rosie Boycott, to be Baroness Boycott, of Whitefield in the County of Somerset – 9 July 2018 
 Deborah Bull, to be Baroness Bull, of Aldwych in the City of Westminster – 11 July 2018
 Sir Jeremy Heywood, to be Baron Heywood of Whitehall, of Glossop in the County of Derbyshire – 26 October 2018

Lord Lieutenant 
 Dr. Sarah Furness – to be Lord-Lieutenant of the County of Rutland. – 14 February 2018
 Arvind Michael Kapur,  – to be Lord-Lieutenant of the County of Leicestershire. – 11 May 2018
 Alison Millar – to be Lord-Lieutenant of the County of Londonderry. – 17 May 2018
 Tia C Jones – to be Lord-Lieutenant of Powys. – 17 July 2018
 Susan Sheldon – to be Lord-Lieutenant of the Isle of Wight. – 26 October 2018
 Edward William Gillespie,  – to be Lord-Lieutenant of and in the County of Gloucestershire. – 30 October 2018
 Elizabeth Patricia Gilroy – to be Lord-Lieutenant of the Stewartry of Kirkcudbright. – 5 November 2018
 Johanna Ropner – to be Lord-Lieutenant of the County of North Yorkshire. – 6 November 2018
 Anna Turner – to be Lord-Lieutenant of Shropshire. – 13 November 2018

Privy Counsellor 
 The Hon. Sir Seamus Treacy,  – 12 January 2018
 The Rt Rev. Dame Sarah Mullally,  – 14 March 2018
 The Hon. Enele Sopoaga, MP – 14 March 2018
 The Hon. Sir Peter Coulson,  – 26 April 2018
 Robert Goodwill,  – 26 April 2018
 The Hon. Sir George Leggatt,  – 26 April 2018
 Kevan Jones,  – 26 April 2018
 The Rt Hon. The Baroness Chakrabarti,  – 18 May 2018
 Geoffrey Cox,  – 11 July 2018
 Dominic Raab,  – 11 July 2018
 The Hon. Sir Jonathan Baker,  – 7 November 2018
 The Hon. Dame Nicola Davies,  – 7 November 2018
 The Hon. Sir Nicholas Green,  – 7 November 2018
 The Hon. Sir Charles Haddon-Cave,  – 7 November 2018
 Steve Barclay,  – 20 November 2018
 Mark Tami,  – 23 November 2018
 Christopher Pincher,  – 23 November 2018

Most Noble Order of the Garter

Knight Companion of the Order of the Garter (KG)
 The Rt Hon. The Viscount Brookeborough – 23 April 2018

Lady Companion of the Order of the Garter (LG)
 Dame Mary Fagan,  – 23 April 2018

Stranger Knight Companion of the Order of the Garter (KG)
 His Majesty The King of the Netherlands – 23 October 2018

Knight Bachelor 

 The Hon. Mr Justice Timothy Miles Fancourt,  – 8 February 2018
 The Rt Hon. David Evennett,  – 18 May 2018
 The Rt Hon. John Hayes,  – 23 November 2018

Most Honourable Order of the Bath

Knight Grand Cross of the Order of the Bath (GCB) 
 The Rt Hon. The Lord Heywood of Whitehall,  – 31 October 2018

Most Distinguished Order of St Michael and St George

Knight / Dame Grand Cross of the Order of St Michael and St George (GCMG) 
 Her Excellency The Hon. Sandra Mason, DA, QC – Governor-General of Barbados – 8 January 2018
 His Excellency The Hon. Neville Cenac – Governor-General of Saint Lucia – 18 January 2018

Knight Commander of the Order of St Michael and St George (KCMG) 
Honorary
 Dr. George Vella, Maltese national – Former Minister of Foreign Affairs, Republic of Malta – For services to UK-Malta relations and the Commonwealth.

Companion of the Order of St Michael and St George (CMG) 
Honorary
 Dr. Stefan Nicolaas Dercon, Belgian national – Chief Economist, Department for International Development – For services to economics and international development.

Royal Victorian Order

Knight Grand Cross of the Royal Victorian Order (GCVO) 
 Lieutenant-Colonel Sir Andrew Ford,  – upon relinquishing his appointment as Comptroller, Lord Chamberlain's Office – 11 December 2018
 The Rt. Hon. The Lord Vestey,  – upon relinquishing his appointment as Master of the Horse – 12 December 2018

Knight Commander of the Royal Victorian Order (KCVO) 
 Captain Nicholas Peter Wright,  – upon relinquishing his appointment as Private Secretary to The Princess Royal – 11 December 2018

Commander of the Royal Victorian Order (CVO) 
 Dr. Jonathan James Cornelius Holliday,  – on the relinquishment of his appointment as Apothecary to the Queen at Windsor– 14 December 2018

Lieutenant of the Royal Victorian Order (LVO) 
 Christopher Robin Weatherley – on his retirement as Fire Safety and Access Manager, London Palaces.
 Edward Sackville Lane Fox – on the relinquishment of his role as Private Secretary to The Duke and Duchess of Sussex.
 David Frank Westwood,  – on his retirement as Exhibitions and Maintenance Conservator, Royal Collection Trust
 Oliver Henry Urquhart Irvine – on the relinquishment of his appointment as Assistant Keeper of the Royal Archives – 14 December 2018
 Sally Osman – upon relinquishing her appointment as Director of Royal Communication – 18 December 2018

Member of the Royal Victorian Order (MVO) 
 Keith Sanderson – on his retirement as Head Chauffeur, Royal Household
 Captain (QGO) Surendrakumar Gurung, The Queen's Gurkha Signals
 Captain (QGO) Dillikumar Rai, The Royal Gurkha Rifles

Most Excellent Order of the British Empire

Knight / Dame Commander of the Order of the British Empire (KBE / DBE) 

 The Hon. Mrs Justice Sara Elizabeth Cockerill,  – 12 January 2018
 The Hon. Mrs Justice Christina Caroline Lambert,  – 8 February 2018

Honorary
 Prof. Vitit Muntarbhorn, Thai national – United Nations expert in human rights; Professor of Law, Chulalongkorn University, Bangkok –  For services to International Human Rights.

Commander of the Order of the British Empire (CBE) 

Military division
 Commodore William Jonathan Warrender,  – 11 May 2018
 Air Vice-Marshal John Jackson Stringer, Royal Air Force – 11 May 2018
 Brigadier Nicholas Stephen Pond,  – 23 November 2018

Officer of the Order of the British Empire (OBE) 

Military division
 Lieutenant Colonel Jason Ainley, Corps of Royal Engineers – 11 May 2018
 Wing Commander Kathryn Elizabeth Ferris, Royal Air Force – 11 May 2018
 Wing Commander Mark David Lorriman-Hughes, Royal Air Force – 11 May 2018
 Wing Commander Matthew James Peterson, Royal Air Force – 11 May 2018
 Colonel John Wakelin – 23 November 2018

Honorary
 Hofesh Shechter, German/Israeli national – For services to contemporary dance.
Professor Teo Soo-Hwang, Malaysian national - For developing research collaborations on Asian cancer between Malaysia and Britain.

Member of the Order of the British Empire (MBE) 

Military division
 Captain Patrick Halford, Royal Marines – 11 May 2018
 Colour Sergeant Mark Roughsedge, Royal Marines – 11 May 2018
 Major James David Brown, Grenadier Guards – 11 May 2018
 Squadron Leader Craig Robert Ledieu, Royal Air Force – 11 May 2018
 Squadron Leader Cristopher Andrew Right, Royal Air Force – 23 November 2018
 Acting Major Jon Sydarby Heathcliff Hassain, Corps of Royal Engineers, Army Reserve – 23 November 2018
 Acting Major Timothy James Graham, The Royal Scots Dragoons Guard – 23 November 2018
 Lieutenant Colonel Charles Edward Digby Grist, The Rifles – 23 November 2018
 Major Peter Alexander Houlton-Hart, The Royal Gurkha Rifles – 23 November 2018
 Sergeant Abigail Frances Morrow, Royal Army Physical Training Corps – 23 November 2018
 Squadron Leader Christopher Andrew Wright, Royal Air Force – 23 November 2018

Honorary
 Frank Havrah Fassett, US national – For services to the crafts of knitting and needlework.
 Natascha Biebow, German national – For services to children's writers and illustrators.
 Claudia Mariel Papa Fragomen, Argentinian national – For services to the British community and the British Embassy in Argentina.
 Bryan David Lewis, Irish national – For services to education and charity.

British Empire Medal (BEM) 

Honorary
 Judith Houlahan, Irish national – For services to the health and welfare of older people in Northern Ireland.
 Milena Kolarikova Ba, Czech and Dutch national – For services to the commemoration of British soldiers in Belgium.
 Cristina Monteiro, Spanish national – For services to British commercial interests and charitable work in Madrid.
 Ulf Axel Mikael Olin, Finnish national – For services to the British Embassy Helsinki, Finland.
 George Psaradakis, Greek national – For services to the community in London.
 Milagros Villanueva, Filipino national – For services to the British Embassy Brasilia.

Military Cross (MC) 

 Corporal Hugo Wilton, Royal Marines – 11 May 2018
 Colour Sergeant Daniel Mark Garratt, Parachute Regiment – 11 May 2018

Distinguished Flying Cross (DFC) 

 Flight Lieutenant Thomas Philip Hansford, Royal Air Force – 23 November 2018

Air Force Cross (AFC) 

 Squadron Leader Ian Samuel Dornan, Royal Air Force – 11 May 2018
 Flight Lieutenant Ben Wallis, Royal Air Force – 11 May 2018

Queen's Gallantry Medal (QGM) 

 Air Engineering Technician (Mechanical) Stuart Maurice Rogers, Royal Navy – 11 May 2018
 Leading Seaman (Diver) Simon Wharton, Royal Navy – 23 November 2018
 Chief Petty Officer (Diver) Kristopher Fenwick, Royal Navy – 23 November 2018

Royal Victorian Medal (RVM) 

Gold
 Philip Shaun Croasdale,  –  formerly Welfare and Housing Manager, Royal Household.

Mentioned in Despatches 

 Captain Thomas James Limb, Royal Marines – 11 May 2018
 Acting Lance Corporal Robert Patrick Neill, Royal Marines – 11 May 2018
 Lance Corporal Nathan William Fletcher, The Parachute Regiment – 11 May 2018
 Sergeant Andrew Mather, The Royal Irish Regiment – 11 May 2018
 Lance Corporal Charles Anthony Dexter Taylor, The Parachute Regiment – 11 May 2018
 Squadron Leader Matthew Frederick Axcell, Royal Air Force – 11 May 2018
 Flight Lieutenant Helena Bullivant, Royal Air Force – 11 May 2018

Queen's Commendation for Bravery 
 Sergeant Christopher Samuel, Royal Marines – 11 May 2018
 Sergeant Alistair James Seddon, Royal Marines – 11 May 2018
 Petty Officer (Diver) Toby Stuart Jones, Royal Navy – 11 May 2018
 Acting Flight Sergeant Benjamin Martin Howarth, Royal Air Force – 11 May 2018
 Leading Seaman (Diver) Matthew John O’Brien, Royal Navy – 23 November 2018
 Able Seaman (Diver) Joshua Thomas Smith, Royal Navy – 23 November 2018

Queen's Commendation for Valuable Service 

 Colour Sergeant Omar Acid, Royal Marines – 11 May 2018
 Colonel Daniel Blanchford,  – 11 May 2018
 Petty Officer Warfare Specialist (Electronic Warfare) James Hick, Royal Navy – 11 May 2018
 Sergeant Paul Richards, Royal Marines – 11 May 2018
 Corporal Aleksandr David Stovell, Royal Marines – 11 May 2018
 Colour Sergeant Michael Waker, Royal Marines – 11 May 2018
 Acting Lieutenant Colonel Philip Matthew Birch, The Royal Anglian Regiment – 11 May 2018
 Major Victoria Anne Bullied, Queen Alexandra's Royal Army Nursing Corps – 11 May 2018
 Major Noel Clark Claydon-Swales, The Light Dragoons – 11 May 2018
 Major Fiona Allison Dangerfield, The Royal Logistic Corps – 11 May 2018
 Colonel Andrew Bernard Jackson – 11 May 2018
 Warrant Officer Class 2 Peter Keogh, The Royal Irish Regiment – 11 May 2018
 Major Clodia Nicolette O'Neill, Corps of Royal Engineers – 11 May 2018
 Acting Sergeant Thomas Andrew Stokes, Intelligence Corps – 11 May 2018
 Lance Corporal Liam Derek Stott, Royal Army Medical Corps – 11 May 2018
 Warrant Officer Class 2 Luke Townsin, Corps of Royal Engineers – 11 May 2018
 Staff Sergeant Mark Robert Brodrick, Royal Air Force – 11 May 2018
 Flight Lieutenant Gregory Stuart Mould, Royal Air Force – 11 May 2018
 Mrs Lisa Gardner, Civil Servant – 11 May 2018
 Flight Lieutenant Alexander Eeveson, Royal Air Force – 23 November 2018
 Wing Commander Cristopher James Hoyle, Royal Air Force – 23 November 2018
 Acting Flight Lieutenant Laura McDonald, Royal Air Force – 23 November 2018
 Squadron Leader Edward Alexandar Sellers, Royal Air Force – 23 November 2018
 Major Thomas Charles Lilleyman, Corps of Royal Engineers – 23 November 2018
 Sergeant William Nicholas MacFarlane, Royal Marines – 23 November 2018
 Sergeant James Oldale, Royal Marines – 23 November 2018
 Lieutenant Amy Gilmore, Royal Navy – 23 November 2018
 Major Thomas James Quin, Royal Marines – 23 November 2018
 Staff Sergeant Bradley Ross Carter, Corps of Royal Engineers, Army Reserve – 23 November 2018
 Captain Sam Patterson, The Royal Logistic Corps – 23 November 2018
 Captain Robert Matthew George Price, The Rifles – 23 November 2018
 Captain Lucy Rose Stearn, Intelligence Corps – 23 November 2018
 Acting Corporal Joseph Steer, Intelligence Corps – 23 November 2018
 Lieutenant Colonel Benjamin Mark Wilde, The Mercian Regiment – 23 November 2018
 Flight Sergeant Benjamin David Crossley, Royal Air Force – 23 November 2018
 Flight Lieutenant Alexander Eveson, Royal Air Force – 23 November 2018

Order of St John

Knight of the Order of St John 

 Dr. Maged Abu Ramadan
 Alderman Charles Edward Beck Bowman
 The Very Rev. John Cairns, 
 Dr. John Ferguson-Smith
 Vice Admiral Sir Paul Lambert, 
 Joseph Mackie
 Stephen James Brindley Highes
 The Most Rev. Dr. Thabo Cecil Makgoba
 Graham James Gillespie
 His Excellency Sir Frank Kabui, 
 Alderman Peter Estlin
 James Alexander Bingham
 Dr. Sarath Malcolm Samarage

Dame of the Order of St John 

 Christine Ruby Benson
 Her Excellency Dame Sandra Mason,

Commander of the Order of St John 

 Clive Nicholas BOOTHMAN
 Martin Peter CALLAGHAN
 Dr Malcolm Robert GOLIN
 George Findlay MACRAE
 Geoffrey John STREETER
 Alexander Edwards URQUHART
 Sheila Ann, Mrs FERGUSON-SMITH
 Elizabeth Stewart, Mrs HAMILTON

Officer of the Order of St John 

 David John AMOS
 Lieutenant Colonel Giles De MARGARY TD
 Paul Leonard FRENCH
 William Alfred Anthony HACKETT
 Angus John LOUDON MBE
 Ewen Alexander MACDONALD
 Dennis William MARSHALL
 Paul MEALOR
 Geoffrey Ian NICHOLLS
 Andrew Ian SMITH
 Malcolm SLATER
 George Alexander WAY
 Miss Lynn Elaine CLEAL
 Solange Hazel, Mrs CRIPPS
 Sarah, Mrs MORE-MOLYNEUX
 Miss Katherine Mary SMITH

Member of the Order of St John 

 Mark Joseph ADHEN
 Kenneth BLACKMAN
 William Stephen CADMAN
 Mark CORETH
 Thomas James DIMMOCK
 Andrew Mark EDWARDS
 David Thomas Sinclair GIBB
 Canon Mark Richard GRIFFIN
 Alderman and Sheriff Timothy Russell HAILES JP
 Donald Angus Stuart MacGREGGOR
 Steven John MITCHELL
 Steven John MULLOY
 Major Dennis Reginald OUTRAM
 Reverend Mark PERRY
 Major Christopher John PICKIN
 Kenneth PRITCHARD
 Sheriff Neil Graham Morgan REDCLIFFE
 David Michael Andrew REES
 Squadron Leader Alistair Keith RIDLAND
 Neil ROLLAND
 Anthony Michael SMITH
 Lieutenant Commander Rex THORNBOROUGH RD* RNR
 Lesley, Mrs BODKIN
 Alison, Mrs CHALMERS
 Sharon Michelle, Mrs CHAMBERS
 Miss Patricia Mary COUGHLAN
 Miss Jennifer DUKE
 Jess Lawson Love, Mrs DUNCAN
 Miss Lynne EDWARDS
 Marita Faye, Mrs EDWARDS
 Nicola Yvette, Mrs GEORGE
 Victoria Ann, Mrs HARRISON
 Deborah Jane, Mrs HAVILL
 Dawn Maria, Mrs MACKINNON
 Wendy, Mrs McEVOY
 Jacqueline Susan, Mrs PHILLIPS-CLARKE
 Miss Sarah Philippa Smith SCOTT
 Erica Ann, Miss SEGGIE
 Miss Gillian Sarah TANNER
 Janice, Mrs WEBSTER
 Miss Eve WRIGHT

References 

Special Honours
2018 awards in the United Kingdom
New Zealand awards
2018 awards in Australia
2018 awards in Canada
British honours system